The Samsung Galaxy A60 and Samsung Galaxy M40 are Android phablets manufactured by Samsung Electronics as part of its fifth-generation Galaxy A series lineup and first-generation Galaxy M series lineup. The phones feature Android 9 (Pie) with Samsung's proprietary One UI skin, 64 or 128 GB of internal stora|ge, and a 3500 mAh battery. The A60 is marketed for China, while the M40 is marketed for India and other countries. The A60 and M40 are identical except for colors, pricing, RAM and LTE bands. The A60 was unveiled on April 17, 2019, while the M40 was unveiled on June 11, 2019.

Specifications

Hardware
The Samsung Galaxy A60 and M40 have a 6.3” FHD+ (1080×2340) PLS-TFT Infinity-O Display with a circular cutout for the front camera, similar to the Galaxy S10. The phones have 4GB and 6GB RAM versions (6GB only for the A60), and have 64GB or 128GB of internal storage that is expandable to 512GB via the microSD card slot. The phones measure 155.3 × 73.9 × 7.9 mm (6.11 × 2.91 × 0.31 in) and weigh 168g, featuring a 3500 mAh battery.

The phones also have a dual-SIM slot and supports 15W  charging using Qualcomm Quick Charge 2.0 over USB-C.

Camera
The phones have a triple-lens camera consisting of a 32MP f/1.7 wide-angle lens, 8MP f/2.2 ultra-wide angle lens, and a 5MP 3D depth sensor. 

The triple-lens camera can create a bokeh effect through the 3D depth sensor. There is a 16MP f/2.0 selfie camera. The camera also has Samsung's scene optimizer technology that recognizes 20 different scenes and automatically adjusts the camera. 

The phones also can record 4K video through the camera application.

Software
The Samsung Galaxy A60 and M40 run on Android Pie with Samsung's  One UI skin that repositions the touch area in stock Samsung apps towards the bottom, making the interface easier for one handed use with a large screen. Features include Bixby, Google Assistant, Samsung Health, and Samsung Pay, although the Bixby button is not included.

Reception
The A60 and M40 received mixed reviews. SamMobile praised the design, performance and battery life, but lamented the lack of a 3.5mm headphone jack and the usage of an LCD panel rather than an AMOLED while criticizing the price, concluding that the M40 "is a phone that shouldn't really exist" as a higher priced alternative to the A50. It also noted that the video recording was a strong point along with the ultra-wide lens, but the cameras struggled in low-light. The software was criticized for lacking features as well. GSMArena gave both a 3.3/5, having similar complaints about the camera and display.

References

External links
 (M40)

Samsung smartphones
Phablets
Samsung Galaxy
Samsung mobile phones
Android (operating system) devices
Mobile phones introduced in 2019
Mobile phones with multiple rear cameras